Dolphin is a surname. Notable people with the surname include:

Arthur Dolphin (1885–1942), English first-class cricketer
Bill Dolphin (born 1881), Australian rules footballer
David Dolphin (born 1940), Canadian biochemist
David Dolphin (cricketer) (born 1950), Zimbabwean cricketer
Frank Dolphin, Irish businessman
James Dolphin (born 1983), New Zealand sprinter
John Dolphin (1905–1973), British engineer and inventor